Carly Salmon (born 9 July 1999) is an Australian Paralympic athlete who competes in long jump and the 100 metre and 200 metre sprints.

Personal
Salmon was born 9 July 1999 in Wagga Wagga. A stroke at birth left her with cerebral palsy that restricts movement on the left side of her body. Salmon attended Mater Dei Catholic College, which is situated in her hometown of Wagga Wagga.

Results
In 2013, Salmon was the youngest member of the Australian team when she competed in the IPC World Championships in Lyon, France where she won bronze in the 200 m T35 final. Salmon was also in the 100 metre final, where she finished 5th with an Oceania record-breaking time of 16.82. In March 2015, 
Salmon competed in the under-20's Women's 200 m at the Australian Junior Athletics Championships in March, where she came first with a time of 35.84.

At the 2015 IPC Athletics World Championships in Doha, she came fifth in her heat of the Women's 100 m T35 and did not start in the Women's 200 m. She nearly retired from para athletics after not being selected for 2016 Rio Paralympics.

At the 2017 World Para Athletics Championships in London, England, she finished sixth in the Women's 100m T35 and Women's 200m T35 events.

Recognition
Due to her success at the IPC World Championships, The Daily Advertiser’s Wagga Sports Awards named Salmon Junior Sportsperson for June, 2013. Salmon also received an athlete grant from the AIS in 2014/2015 for her podium finish.

References

External links
 
 Carly Salmon at Athletics Australia
 Carly Salmon at Australian Athletics Historical Results

1999 births
Living people
Australian female sprinters
Paralympic athletes of Australia
Athletes (track and field) at the 2016 Summer Paralympics
Cerebral Palsy category Paralympic competitors
Track and field athletes with cerebral palsy
Australian Institute of Sport Paralympic track and field athletes
Sportspeople from Wagga Wagga
21st-century Australian women
20th-century Australian women